Burriana or Borriana is a municipality in eastern Spain, in the province of Castellón, part of the Valencian Community. Its population exceeds 34,000.

The town is located by the Mediterranean Sea, at the lowest region of the Plana Baixa, surrounded by orange tree fields watered by the Millars River.

It has about 15 km of coastline, including Borriana's principal beach "El Arenal", one of the most attractive spots, especially during the summer. "El Arenal" has about 2 km of seashore, has been awarded the blue flag, which recognizes its magnificent sand and water thanks to the treatments carried out by the city council.

The seaside is 1.5 km from the center of the town. During the summer, the seaside population can triple due to vacationers and from locals from the center of the town moving into the seaside. The town is reachable from Castelló de la Plana through the CV-18 or the N-340 routes.

In literature, Burriana is briefly described by James A. Michener in the book, Iberia. As a young man, Michener landed there as a part of a ship crew. The merchant vessel was there to collect oranges for the Scottish marmalade industry. Oranges, after being loaded into metal barrels, were dragged out to sea by bulls.

The town displays many memorial spots dedicated to James A. Michener, such as a street and a sign that quotes one of his passages, where he expresses his first sight of Borriana as he approached land from the sea.

Villages
 Burriana town proper
 Les Alqueries de Santa Bàrbara
 El Port de Borriana (Borriana harbor)
 El Grau de Borriana
 La Serratella
 Les Alqueries del Ferrer
 Poblats marítims
 Virrangues (uninhabited)

Main sights

Church of El Salvador (13th century), with an apse in early Gothic style, and Romanesque elements as well. The bell tower is from the 15th century.
Sea Tower (16th century)
Modernist House
Underwater Archaeology Center
Clot de la Mare de Déu natural park
Orange Museum
Municipal Archaeology Museum

Notable people

 Juan Bautista Soler Martí (1879–1936); businessman, alcalde of Burriana (1930–1931), co-responsible for rapid upgrade of the port infrastructure
 Jaime Chicharro Sánchez-Guió (1889–1934); politician and entrepreneur, heavily contributed to development of the Burriana harbor
 Juan Granell Pascual (1902–1962); politician and official, during early Francoism promoted and secured new investments in railways, roads, streets, port, education, sewage and other municipal infrastructure
 Enric Monsonís Domingo (1931–2011); liberal politician, served as the head of the Pre-autonomous Council of the Valencian Country from 1979 to 1982.
 Vicente Enrique y Tarancón (1907–1994); Cardinal of the Roman Catholic Church, served as Archbishop of Madrid from 1971 to 1983.
 Mercedes Sanchordi (1969–2018); town councillor and member of the Corts Valencianes

Twin towns
 Vila-real, Spain

References

External links

Official website
Burriana news

Municipalities in the Province of Castellón
Plana Baixa